Neuenstadt may refer to the following places:

Neuenstadt, German name for La Neuveville, Switzerland
Neuenstadt am Kocher, town in Baden-Württemberg, Germany

See also
Württemberg-Neuenstadt, name of two branch lines of the ducal House of Württemberg